Marj Fogelman (born June 10, 1972) is an American politician serving in the Minnesota House of Representatives since 2023. A member of the Republican Party of Minnesota, Fogelman represents District 21B in southwestern Minnesota, which includes the city of Worthington and parts of Cottonwood, Jackson, Martin, Nobles, and Watonwan Counties.

Early life, education and career 
Fogelman received an associate degree in accounting from Southwestern Technical College.

Minnesota House of Representatives 
Fogelman was first elected to the Minnesota House of Representatives in 2022, after redistricting and the retirement of Republican incumbent Rod Hamilton. She serves on the Capital Investment and Transportation Finance and Policy Committees.

Electoral history

Personal life 
Fogelman lives in Fulda, Minnesota with her husband, Michael, and has four children.

References

External links 

Living people
21st-century American politicians
21st-century American women politicians
Republican Party members of the Minnesota House of Representatives
People from Fulda, Minnesota